The following lists events that happened during 1979 in the Union of Soviet Socialist Republics.

Incumbents
 General Secretary of the Communist Party of the Soviet Union: Leonid Brezhnev (1964-1982)
 Premier of the Soviet Union: Alexei Kosygin (1964–1980)

Events
 1979 Soviet economic reform
 Soviet–Afghan War

Births
 19 January – Svetlana Khorkina, Russian artistic gymnast
 22 January – Olga Dolzhykova, Ukrainian-Norwegian chess player and educator.
  26 January - Artem Datsyshyn, Ukrainian ballet dancer (d. 2022)
  1 February - Mikhail Rudkovskiy, former Russian professional football player
 30 July - Denis Churkin, former Russian professional football player

See also
1979 in fine arts of the Soviet Union
List of Soviet films of 1979

References

 
1970s in the Soviet Union
Soviet Union
Soviet Union
Soviet Union